cis-2-Decenoic acid is an unsaturated fatty acid.  It is a colorless oil.

Preparation and occurrence
The compound can be prepared from 1-iodonon-1-ene by lithium halogen exchange followed by carbonation.

cis-2-Decenoic acid is produced by Pseudomonas aeruginosa. It may have potential in fighting biofilm implied in infectious diseases that are present in more than 60% of Hospital-acquired infection.

References

Fatty acids
Enoic acids